Australia: Land Beyond Time is a 2002 IMAX film documenting the natural environment of Australia. The film has a 40-minute runtime. The film was captured by pilot/filmmaker David Flatman on a two-engine kit plane. The film depicts natural landmarks such as Lake Eyre and Uluru. It was written by Les Murray, scored by David Bridie, and narrated by Alex Scott.

References

2002 films
2002 short documentary films
IMAX short films
Films set in Australia
Films shot in Australia
IMAX documentary films